
Somme or The Somme may refer to:

Places
Somme (department), a department of France
Somme, Queensland, Australia
Canal de la Somme, a canal in France
Somme (river), a river in France

Arts, entertainment, and media
Somme (book), a First World War military history book
 The Somme (film), a 1927 British documentary film
The Somme – From Defeat to Victory, BBC TV documentary

Military
 French tanker Somme, a French Navy tanker and command ship
 HMS Somme (1918), a British World War I S-class destroyer
 Battle of the Somme
 Somme American Cemetery and Memorial
 Somme Heritage Centre

See also
Battle of the Somme (disambiguation) for other uses

Somma (disambiguation)